A chaebol is a large industrial South Korean conglomerate run and controlled by an individual or family. A chaebol often consists of multiple diversified affiliates, controlled by a person or group whose power over the group often exceeds legal authority. Several dozen large South Korean family-controlled corporate groups fall under this definition. The term first appeared in English text in 1972. 

Chaebols have also played a significant role in South Korean politics. In 1988, a member of a chaebol family, Chung Mong-joon, president of Hyundai Heavy Industries, successfully ran for the National Assembly of South Korea. Other business leaders were also chosen to be members of the National Assembly through proportional representation. Hyundai has made efforts in the thawing of North Korean relations, despite some controversy. Many South Korean family-run chaebols have been criticized for low dividend payouts and other governance practices that favor controlling shareholders at the expense of ordinary investors.

Etymology 
Chaebol derived from the McCune–Reischauer romanization, chaebŏl, of the Korean word jaebeol (from jae "wealth or property" + beol "faction or clan" – also written with the same Chinese characters 財閥 as zaibatsu in Japan. The first known use in an English text was in 1972.

History

South Korea's economy was small and predominantly agricultural well into the mid-20th century. However, the policies of President Park Chung Hee spurred rapid industrialisation by promoting large businesses, following his seizure of power in 1961. The First Five Year Economic Plan by the government set industrial policy towards new investment, and chaebols were to be guaranteed loans from the banking sector. The chaebol played a key role in developing new industries, markets, and export production, helping make South Korea one of the Four Asian Tigers.

Although South Korea's major industrial programs did not begin until the early 1960s, the origins of the country's entrepreneurial elite were found in the political economy of the 1950s. Very few Koreans owned or managed larger corporations during the Japanese colonial period. After the Japanese left in 1945, some Korean businessmen obtained the assets of some of the Japanese firms, several of which grew into the chaebols of the 1990s.

The Japanese colonial government sometimes sought to co-opt local businessmen, and wealthy individuals often linked to land ownership, and a significant minority of industries were jointly owned by Japanese and Korean businesses. A few Korean chaebols such as Kyungbang came into existence during this era.

The companies, as well as certain other firms that were formed in the late 1940s and early 1950s, had close links with Syngman Rhee's First Republic, which lasted from 1948 to 1960. It is confirmed that many of these companies received special treatment from the government in return for kickbacks and other payments.

When the military took over the government in 1961, its leaders announced that they would eradicate the corruption that had plagued the Rhee administration and eliminate "injustice" from society. Some leading industrialists were arrested and charged with corruption, but the new government realized that it would need the help of entrepreneurs if the government's ambitious plans to modernize the economy were to be fulfilled. A compromise was reached, under which many of the accused corporate leaders paid fines to the government. Subsequently, there was increased cooperation between corporate and government leaders in modernizing the economy.

Government-chaebol cooperation was essential to the subsequent economic growth and astounding successes that began in the early 1960s. Driven by the urgent need to turn the economy away from consumer goods and light industries toward heavy, chemical, and import-substitution industries, political leaders and government planners relied on the ideas and cooperation of chaebol leaders. The government provided the blueprints for industrial expansion; the chaebol realized the plans. However, the chaebol-led industrialization accelerated the monopolistic and oligopolistic concentration of capital and economically profitable activities in the hands of a limited number of conglomerates.

Park used the chaebol as a means of economic growth. Exports were encouraged, reversing Rhee's policy of reliance on imports. Performance quotas were established.

Chaebols were able to grow because of two factors: foreign loans and special favours. Access to foreign technology also was critical to the growth of the chaebol through the 1980s. Under the guise of "guided capitalism", the government selected companies to undertake projects and channelled funds from foreign loans. The government guaranteed repayment should a company be unable to repay its foreign creditors. Additional loans were made available from domestic banks. In the late 1980s, chaebols dominated the industrial sector and were especially prevalent in manufacturing, trading, and heavy industries.

Chaebols experienced tremendous growth beginning in the early 1960s in connection with the expansion of South Korean exports. The growth resulted from the production of a diversity of goods rather than just one or two products. Innovation and the willingness to develop new product lines were critical. In the 1950s and early 1960s, chaebols concentrated on wigs and textiles; by the mid-1970s and 1980s, heavy, defence, and chemical industries had become predominant. While these activities were important in the early 1990s, real growth was occurring in the electronics and high-technology industries. Chaebols also were responsible for turning the trade deficit in 1985 into a trade surplus in 1986. The current account balance, however, fell from more than US$14 billion in 1988 to US$5 billion in 1989.

Chaebols continued their explosive growth in export markets in the 1980s. By the late 1980s, they had become financially independent and secure, thereby eliminating the need for further government-sponsored credit and assistance.

By the 1990s, South Korea was one of the largest newly industrialised countries and boasted a standard of living comparable to industrialized countries.

President Kim Young-sam began to challenge the chaebol, but it was not until the 1997 Asian financial crisis that the weaknesses of the system were widely understood. Of the 30 largest chaebols, 11 collapsed between July 1997 and June 1999. Initially, the crisis was caused by a sharp drop in the value of the currency and led to immediate cash flow concerns needed to pay foreign debts; however, the lower costs ultimately helped the stronger chaebols expand their brands to Western markets. Yet, the decline of nearby export markets in Southeast Asia, which had been fueling growth by incurring large debts, proved fatal to many. The remaining chaebols also became far more specialized in their focus. For example, with a population ranked 26th in the world, before the crisis, the country had seven major automobile manufacturers. Afterward, only two major manufacturers remained intact though two additional continued, in a smaller capacity, under General Motors and Renault.  Chaebol debts were not only to state industrial banks but also to independent banks and their financial services subsidiaries. The scale of the loan defaults meant that banks could neither foreclose nor write off bad loans without themselves collapsing, so the failure to service these debts quickly caused a systemic banking crisis, and South Korea turned to the IMF for assistance. The most spectacular example came in mid-1999, with the collapse of the Daewoo Group, which had some US$80 billion in unpaid debt. At the time, it was the largest corporate bankruptcy in history.

Investigations also exposed widespread corruption in the chaebol, particularly fraudulent accounting, and bribery.

Still, South Korea recovered quickly from the crisis, and most of the blame for economic problems was shifted to the IMF. The remaining chaebols have grown substantially since the crisis, but they have maintained far lower debt levels.

In 2014, the largest chaebol, Samsung, composed about 17% of the South Korean economy and held roughly US$17 billion in cash. However, recent financial statements of these chaebols showed that chaebols are slowly losing power over either international competition or internal disruptions from newly emerging startups. The net profit/income of South Korea's top conglomerates has decreased from 2012 to 2015.

Corporate governance

Management structure 
Some chaebols are one large corporation while others have broken up into loosely connected groups of separate companies sharing a common name. Even in the latter case, each is almost always owned, controlled, or managed by the same family group.

South Korea's chaebols are often compared with Japan's keiretsu business groupings, the successors of the pre-war zaibatsu. While the "chaebol" is similar to the "zaibatsu" (the words share the same hanja/kanji), some major differences have evolved:
 Chaebols are still largely controlled by their founding families while keiretsu are controlled by groups of professional managers. Chaebol, furthermore, are more family-based and family-oriented than their Japanese counterparts.
 Chaebols are centralized in ownership while keiretsu are more decentralized.
 Chaebols have more often formed subsidiaries to produce components for exports while large Japanese corporations have mostly switched to employing outside contractors.
 The major structural difference between Korean chaebols and Japanese keiretsu is that chaebols do not all have their financial institutions. Most were heavily dependent on government loans and loan guarantees in their early years, and they still have a closer relationship with the government than their Japanese counterparts. Chaebols are largely prohibited from owning private banks, partly to spread risk and partly to increase the government's leverage over the banks in areas such as credit allocation. In 1990, government regulations made it difficult for a chaebol to develop an exclusive banking relationship, but following the cascading collapses of the late 1990s, they were somewhat relaxed. Keiretsu has historically worked with an affiliated bank, giving the affiliated companies almost unlimited access to credit, so the economic problems for which the Japanese have been known are zombie banks rather than systemic banking crises. However, many of the largest keiretsu have diversified their debt practices, and public bond sales have become somewhat common.

The chaebol model is heavily reliant on a complex system of interlocking ownership. The owner, with the help of family members, family-owned charities, and senior managers from subsidiaries, has to control only three of four public companies, which control other companies that control subsidiaries. A good example of this practice would be the owner of Doosan, who controlled more than 20 subsidiaries with only minor participation in about 5 companies.

Equity 
The chairman of a typical chaebol possesses a small portion of the equity in the companies under the large umbrella of the chaebol but is very powerful in making decisions and controls all management. For example, Samsung owns 0.5% of the group's listed firms. That demonstrates a weakness in the rule of law. The method that allows this type of possession is called cross-holding, which is a horizontal and vertical structure that enhances the control of the chairman.

Workplace culture 
The typical culture at one of these conglomerates is highly paternalistic. Much of the environment is defined by the chairman who acts as a "fatherly figure" to his subordinates. This can be traced back to the infusion of Neo-Confucian values that permeate Korean society. A chaebol head's demeanour towards his employee can be described as "loving" while maintaining "sternness and a sense of responsibility". Workers commit to long hours, most notably on weekends and holidays, to appease their superiors. Company outings and drinking sessions tend to be compulsory to foster a sense of family and belonging among employees. Employers believe that enhancing a common bond between them would translate into prosperity and productivity for the company. Other practices that would be uncommon for Western workplaces to engage in include gift-giving to employees and arranging dates for workers in search of relationships or marriage.

Chaebols are notoriously hierarchical. As such, it is unusual for an individual to challenge or question the decision-making of his or her boss. This dynamic adds to the culture that orients itself around whoever is in charge but can lead to undesirable circumstances. For example, the Asiana flight 214 crash led critics to speculate that cultural factors prevented a pilot on board from aborting the low-speed landing and thus straying from his superior's commands. Promotion is rarely merit-based. Rather, it is through the order of age and time served to the conglomerate. This is reflected by the fact that most executives are far older than their employees. If a worker does not attain an executive or senior-management role by the age of fifty, he or she is commonly forced to resign. Again, this is attributable to the age-hierarchy dynamics in Korean Confucian culture. A typical firm heavily emphasizes loyalty to the firm, as demonstrated in the standard recruiting process. Newly acquired employees undergo an intense initiation that includes activities such as training camps and singing company-unique songs that reiterate the production goals of the firm.

Relationship with labor unions 
Because of South Korea's long-lasting relationship with chaebols, South Korea has always suppressed and ignored labour unions. As of 2019, there are only two legally recognized labour unions in South Korea: The Federation of Korean Trade Unions and the Korean Confederation of Trade Unions. Despite these unions' attempts at reform, the South Korean government does not take many actions. If a union oversteps and openly criticizes a chaebol, it faces serious repercussions, as chaebols are essentially government entities. It is well known that chaebols evade taxes regularly. When compared to non-chaebol companies, though, chaebols are less likely to evade taxes when facing issues with unions. This is most likely because non-chaebols will actively evade taxes to meet appropriate wages for unionized workers. Chaebols, on the other hand, have enough financial wealth to make "under-the-table" arrangements with unions.

Criticism
Even though the chaebol system helped bring about rapid growth and helped Korea launch itself on the international stage, it caused negative impacts on the Korean economy.

Emergence and inflation
The origins of the chaebol system in South Korea come as a consequence of the Korean War. The war resulted in much destruction and halted industrial production, which led the government to print money to pay for the war and meet the requirements of the United Nations forces for the Korean currency, all of which caused mass inflation. This inflation caused many commodity prices to double every six months.

The government had to react and so devised a plan in providing strong financial incentives to private companies between the 1960s and 1970s. These included the government's choosing to select various family businesses to distribute the incentives (imported raw materials, commodities, bank loans). The impact was immediate, and most of the businesses flourished rapidly. The protection of infant companies allowed them to develop because of the highly regulated market, which prevented foreign companies from entering. Many companies that were not in the circle of businesses saw the system as flawed and corrupted. Corruption scandals have occurred periodically in all chaebols. Such incidents suggest a form of "crony capitalism" which is common in developing countries.

Internal market transactions accountability
Because the government gave out incentives to help businesses, it had a lot of control over them. However, there was no way to ensure the businesses would use the incentives effectively and efficiently. In other words, there was no external monitoring system to monitor chaebols and ensure that they were efficient in the allocation of resources. All businesses undertake internal market transactions, which constitute "purchase and sale of intermediate inputs, the provision and receipt of loan collaterals, and the provision and receipt of payment guarantees among member firms in a business group". There is the question of efficiency, especially in production and management. Therefore, the chaebol system was not very transparent. Behind the scenes, businesses were provided with subsidiary financing and intragroup transactions. This allowed them easy loans to cover their deficits, and before the 1997 Asian financial crisis, huge debts had accumulated, many of which were hidden. That gave the illusion that the system was flourishing into the 1990s.

Relationship with foreign investors
According to the Defense Language Institute Foreign Language Center, the majority of South Korea's economy is driven by exports. South Korea is one of the leading exporters worldwide. Additionally, the majority of investors in the Korean stock market are foreign investors. Out of 711 listed companies in the Korean stock market, approximately 683 have shares that are held by foreign investors. Nearly a third of the market's value is owned by foreigners, a trend that is expected to continue.

Because of their major role in the Korean stock market, foreign investors play a massive part in whether or not chaebol conglomerates remain financially successful. Foreign investors tend to avoid chaebols, especially those that displayed heavy political influence in South Korea, like Samsung and Hyundai. Investors are reluctant to invest in large control-ownership disparity businesses because these companies tended to cheat shareholders to have higher personal financial gain. This information is extremely helpful, especially when it comes to determining how these corrupt conglomerates are still heavily supported, considering foreign investors show little interest in them. A study published in the Journal of the Japanese and International Economies found that after the 1997 Asian financial crisis, foreign investment behavioural patterns changed drastically. While foreign investors like to hold shares in large companies with high profit and liquidity margins, they do not show any particular interest in either chaebol or non-chaebol companies. Nonetheless, chaebols are still able to survive, highlighting just how much power and aid they receive from the Korean government.

"Too big to fail"

During the 1997 Asian financial crisis, bankers feared that chaebols would go bankrupt so they allowed these businesses to roll over their loans each time they were unable to repay their debts. Many did not believe that the chaebols were capable of collapsing and that the more they borrowed, the safer they were.

However, the theory was proven wrong when many businesses collapsed during the crisis. Since they were linked through debt guarantees, many of the companies fell into a chain reaction. The focus on capacity expansion created debt that was manageable when the economy was growing. However, when the economy stalled, debt-to-equity ratios became a huge problem.

Since the crisis, chaebols had less debt and were less vulnerable to similar crises, as was demonstrated in the 2008 crisis. With the growth of the fewer remaining chaebols, however, each of them occupies a larger portion of the economy.

Monopolistic behavior 
The protectionist policies and preferable government treatment granted chaebols the ability to exhibit monopolistic behaviour. The absence of a market free of intervention meant that "true competition" became a rarity in South Korea. Especially in the era before the 1997 Asian financial crisis, the only products available to the Korean people were those made by chaebols. Therefore, the social fabric of the country lacked a welcoming culture toward entrepreneurship. The intensity and extent of market concentration became evident as 80% of the country's GDP is derived from chaebols. The largest of the group, Samsung, exports 20% of South Korea's goods and services alone. Although no longer financially supported by the government, these firms have attained economies of scale on such a massive level that it is extremely difficult for a startup or small or medium enterprise (SME) to surmount the high barriers to entry. A majority of these smaller companies ended up becoming acquired by the chaebols, thereby further stacking their size and economic dominance. During recent years a growing trend to scale globally has increased among aspiring Korean entrepreneurs. Conversely, chaebols have also been moving money abroad with the tacit endorsement of the South Korean government and investing in commercial enterprises, particularly in Koreatown Manhattan, New York City.

To this day, chaebols maintain dominance across all industries. Reductions in tariffs and the removal of trade regulations designed to protect Korean conglomerates have led to increased competition from abroad. However, among domestic firms, chaebols have kept their market share intact. Most notably, Apple's entry into the smartphone market pressured rival Samsung into diversifying its revenue streams from overseas. All but 3 of the top 50 firms listed on the Korean Stock Exchange are designated as chaebols. Consequently, chaebols have more bargaining power and often take pricing action that squeezes both suppliers and consumers. Typically the firms down the supply chain fail to increase their profit margins enough to expand and thus never see growth. Collusion among chaebols is commonplace. Price-fixing acts mean consumers expect to pay an inflated value for most goods and services. For instance, in 2012 Samsung and LG Electronics were fined for colluding to raise prices for home appliances.

Government ties, corruption, and abuse of power 

Since the inception of the chaebol, the government has been closely involved in its affairs. Many of the reforms enacted over the years, especially those under President Kim Dae-Jung, have cracked down on kickbacks and preferential treatment. Moreover, the state is no longer a majority shareholder of any chaebol. But their sheer size and wealth have been used to gain influence. For the most part, the government sees the function of chaebols as crucial to the Korean economy. When President Lee Myung-Bak took office, he pardoned Samsung Group chairman Lee Kun-Hee for tax evasion. President Lee then proceeded to champion pro-chaebol deals, including a nuclear energy contract with the city of Abu Dhabi, and loosened laws preventing the conglomerates from owning financial services companies. Samsung's leader is not the only chaebol chairman to be excused from a criminal conviction. Choi Tae-Won of SK Group, Chung Mong-Koo of Hyundai, Kim Seung-Youn of Hanwha, and Shin Dong-bin of Lotte are a few examples of chairmen who have been charged, convicted, or are currently serving a prison sentence for white-collar crime. Accusations include bribery, tax evasion, accounting fraud, embezzlement, and violent crime. Typically chaebol chairmen are pardoned. 15 August is recognized in South Korea as Liberation Day. This is when the president forgives the chairmen for their infractions to ensure they remain in power in their companies. In the rare case that an executive is sentenced to prison, as the CEOs of SK and CJ group were, it is typically a relatively light punishment of up to 4 years depending on the charge.

Collusion between chaebol members and the government granted preferential statuses to the companies. A chaebol would funnel bribes to politicians and bureaucrats through slush funds and illegal donations. This could help maintain the government's position of power, allowing them to secure contracts for major government projects and provide favourable treatment to the donor firm. Examples of this type of corruption were widespread in the years leading up to the 1997 financial crisis. Many of the firms that benefited from this relationship were too indebted, had poor corporate governance, and were inefficient. There was a huge inflow of capital and a bending of regulation in favour of these problematic firms. Hanbo Group, formerly South Korea's second-largest steel-maker, is a good example of this. In the 1990s the company paid for special arrangements with high-ranking politicians so that it could secure contracts for large government projects over its competitors. Hanbo went bankrupt in 1997 after defaulting on debt payments along with other governance issues. Numerous chaebol companies had similar private agreements with the government in this fashion. It would be most common in companies dealing with heavy industries or projects that involved government procurement and urban planning. In the past, most successful political elections were won with chaebol support. Each time a new administration or regime stepped in, it would gear its policy platform towards chaebol revitalization. This was under the claim that to be a competitive economy more power must be given to the chaebols. In recent years, the leading political parties of South Korea have reversed their pro-large corporate stance to one of economic diversification.

Reforms 
Different reforms have been proposed or enacted to deal with the influence, power, and corruption associated with the chaebols, though it has been questioned whether real reform is possible.

IMF agreement 
Under Kim Dae-Jung and in the wake of the 1997 Asian financial crisis, many reforms were made to the chaebols. Most of these changes pertained to corporate structure, transparency in financial reporting, cuts in government subsidies, corporate governance, and debt stabilization. In 1997, the IMF provided a bailout loan of $60 billion conditional on revision. Distressed financial institutions were to be closed down and those that were deemed viable were to be restructured and recapitalized by the levels it set forth. This affected the chaebol because it severely restricted its easy access to financing which led to over-leveraged balance sheets. Lenient accounting practices and disclosure rules were to be strengthened and standardized for international practice. Hence, transparency was increased to what would be expected from a public company. The chaebols agreed to be subject to independent auditors and were obligated to provide consolidated financial statements regularly.

Government-led reforms and the 2008 crisis 
Kim Dae-Jung enacted what is known as the "Five Principles of Corporate Governance". These were the enhancement of management transparency, strengthening owner-manager accountability, elimination of cross-debt guarantees among chaebol affiliates, improvement of capital structures, and consolidation of core business areas. In his plans, debt-to-equity ratios was to be below 200%.  Chaebol subsidiaries that were debt-laden or on the verge of bankruptcy were instructed to be either liquidated, sold, or put up for merger. Each chaebol-holding group had to break up its subsidiaries and operations so that they were more manageable. By the end of 1997, each had an average of 26.8 subsidiaries. It was hoped that if there were fewer activities, the quality of the remaining businesses would see improvement. Many unrelated branches to their core competencies were swiftly shed. If any of the conglomerates failed to meet the conditions by the set deadlines, strict sanctions would be passed against them. During the 2008 financial crisis, many of these reforms ensured chaebols' quick recovery. Having had exposure to a massive recession before, they learned to cope better than those in foreign countries. With significantly healthier balance sheets and higher cash reserves, the chaebols were able to avoid any liquidity issues. Moreover, with fewer subsidiaries, they were less exposed to the full scope of the crisis and thus helped keep the Korean economy afloat.

President Roh Moo Hyun pushed for even more extensive reform. His administration passed stringent regulations on fraudulent accounting, stock manipulation, and irregular wealth succession. Chaebols were forced to improve objectivity on their board of directors. Rather than having the decision-makers be insiders, affiliates, or family members, chaebols were expected to hold representation that reflected the interests of investors, especially minority shareholders who gained a significant number of rights. As a result, it became easier for chaebols to raise capital through equity rather than riskier debt. This is because the new transparency laws and restructuring boosted investor confidence from abroad.

Regulation

Some competition laws were passed to attempt to limit the expansion of chaebol:
 Law for separate finance from industry: Chaebols may no longer have banks since 1982
 Law for the limit of investment: A chaebol's growth by M&A was limited until 2009
 Law for the limit of assurance: Law defends the insolvency of a chaebol's affiliates

Formally, the Korea Fair Trade Commission announces a limited chaebol list every year by size of industrial assets (not including financial companies).
 Appointment: Korea Fair Trade Commission
 Inclusion: industrial groups (assets: 5 trillion won or more)
 Exclusion: bank and financial groups

Chaebols with limited assurance.

Chaebols by revenue
The following charts list chaebols in order by different categories.

Depictions in popular culture 
Like many other conglomerates across the world, Korean chaebols have a presence in popular media. There are a large number of K-dramas that feature chaebols and chaebol family members. Some of these shows include A Business Proposal, Coffee Prince, What's Wrong with Secretary Kim, and The Heirs. Many Korean dramas portray the lifestyles of chaebol family members in a comedic manner. Other dramas, however, portray them as evil and cunning including Innocent Defendant, Remember, Vincenzo and Big Mouth reflecting the huge income inequality and corruption in South Korea. In addition, many chaebol family members have taken to social media outlets like Instagram and Twitter, where they publish snippets of their personal life. Some chaebols also partake in popular social media trends like mukbangs, as is seen on the popular YouTube channel 햄연지 YONJIHAM. Some have suggested that these attempts at humanizing chaebols are purely financial strategies.

See also 
 Conglomerate
 Economy of South Korea
 Family business
 Four big families of Hong Kong
 Four big families of the Republic of China
 Holding company
 Horizontal integration
 Keiretsu
 List of South Korean companies
 Megacorporation
 National champions
 Vertical integration
 Zaibatsu

References

Sources
 Beck, Peter M. "Are Korea's Chaebol Serious About Restructuring?" Presentation at the Korea 2000 conference, 30 May 2000. Korea Economic Institute of America
 "Unfinished Business," The Economist, 17 April 2003
 "Web site: South Korean conglomerates," The Economist, 11 December 1997
 Whitmore, Stuart and Nakarmi, Laxmi. "Guide to the Groups: The pecking order of the top 20 chaebols," Asiaweek, 10 October 1997.
 S.Korea's Samsung president resigns over corruption scandal

 
Economy of South Korea
Industrial policy